Richard Schwartz (February 4, 1943 - February 6, 2019) was an American bridge player.

He died on February 6, 2019.

Bridge accomplishments

Wins

 North American Bridge Championships (8)
 Jacoby Open Swiss Teams (2) 1992, 2013 
 Lebhar IMP Pairs (1) 1989 
 Chicago Mixed Board-a-Match (1) 2002 
 Spingold (1) 2014 
 Vanderbilt (3) 1997, 1998, 2005

Runners-up

 World Olympiad Seniors Teams Championship (1) 2012
 Cavendish Invitational Pairs (1) 1995
 North American Bridge Championships (9)
 Lebhar IMP Pairs (1) 1990 
 Chicago Mixed Board-a-Match (1) 2006 
 Nail Life Master Open Pairs (1) 1998 
 Reisinger (2) 2002, 2004 
 Silodor Open Pairs (1) 1993 
 Spingold (1) 1996 
 Vanderbilt (2) 2000, 2004

Notes

External links

1943 births
American contract bridge players
2019 deaths